Dischotrichia is a genus of bristle flies in the family Tachinidae. There is at least one described species in Dischotrichia, D. caelibata.

Distribution
Chile.

References

Diptera of South America
Dexiinae
Tachinidae genera
Endemic fauna of Chile